Tapaculos form the avian family Rhinocryptidae. The International Ornithological Committee (IOC) recognizes these 65 species of tapaculos; 49 are in genus Scytalopus and the rest are distributed among 11 other genera. 

This list is presented according to the IOC taxonomic sequence and can also be sorted alphabetically by common name and binomial.

References

T